Willet Ball (1873 – 1 June 1962) was a British journalist and political activist.

Born in Lincoln, Ball began working for the Great Northern Railway Company as a clerk in 1888.  He joined the National Union of Railwaymen (NUR), and also the Social Democratic Federation.  In 1900, he became a full-time sub-editor for the NUR's magazine, Railway Review.  In 1917, he became the publication's editor.

At the 1918 United Kingdom general election, Ball stood as the Labour Party candidate for Luton, taking second place, with 30.6% of the vote.  He did not stand in the 1922 general election, but contested the seat again in 1923, where he saw his vote fall back to only 9.9%.

Ball retired in 1933, spending time serving on the governing bodies of local schools, and indulging his hobby of bowling.  He also served as a magistrate in Luton.

References

1873 births
1962 deaths
English magazine editors
Labour Party (UK) parliamentary candidates
People from Lincoln, England
Social Democratic Federation members